Vitaly Grigoryevich Levchenko (born 28 March 1972, in Tajik SSR) is a Tajikistani retired international footballer and current manager of Neftchi Fergana.

Previously Levchenko was manager of Ukrainian club Arsenal Kyiv's Football School.

Managerial
In June 2016, Levchenko became manager of the Tajikistan U20 team, and assistant manager to Tajikistan manager Khakim Fuzailov.

On 3 June 2017, Levchenko resigned as manager of Barkchi Hisor and Tajikistan U20, and the assistant manager of Tajikistan, to take up a coaching position at Krylia Sovetov.

On 16 April 2019, Levchenko was appointed as the new manager of FC Khujand.

On 17 February 2020, Levchenko was appointed as the new manager of Istiklol Dushanbe. On 27 June 2022, Levchenko left Istiklol after his contract expired.

On 2 July 2022, Levchenko was announced as the new Head Coach of Uzbekistan Super League club Neftchi Fergana.

References

External links 

 
 

1972 births
Living people
People from Khujand
Association football forwards
Soviet footballers
Tajikistani footballers
Tajikistan international footballers
Tajikistani expatriate footballers
Ukrainian expatriate footballers
Ukrainian footballers
Ukrainian football managers
Tajikistani expatriate sportspeople in China
FC CSKA Kyiv players
FC Dynamo Kyiv players
FC Dynamo-2 Kyiv players
FC Arsenal Kyiv players
FC Dynamo Stavropol players
Changchun Yatai F.C. players
SC Tavriya Simferopol players
FC Ural Yekaterinburg players
Expatriate footballers in Russia
Expatriate footballers in Ukraine
Expatriate footballers in China
FC Volgar Astrakhan players
Ukrainian Premier League players
FC Desna Chernihiv managers
FC Knyazha Shchaslyve managers
FC Yednist Plysky managers
FC Arsenal Kyiv managers
Ukrainian First League managers
Tajikistani people of Ukrainian descent
FC Spartak Kostroma players
Footballers at the 1998 Asian Games
Asian Games competitors for Tajikistan